The Asia Cooperation Dialogue (ACD) is an intergovernmental organization created on 18 June 2002 to promote Asian cooperation at a continental level and to ensure coordination among different regional organizations such as the ASEAN, the Gulf Cooperation Council, the  Eurasian Economic Union, the Shanghai Cooperation Organisation, and the SAARC. It is the first international organization to cover the whole of Asia. Its secretariat is in Kuwait City.

History
The idea of an Asia Cooperation Dialogue was raised at the First International Conference of Asian Political Parties (held in Manila between 17–20 September 2000) by Surakiart Sathirathai, then deputy leader of the now defunct Thai Rak Thai Party, on behalf of his party leader, Thaksin Shinawatra, then Prime Minister of Thailand. It was suggested that Asia as a continent should have its own forum to discuss Asia-wide cooperation. Afterwards, the idea of the ACD was formally put forward during the 34th ASEAN Foreign Ministers Meeting in Hanoi, 23–24 July 2001 and at the ASEAN Foreign Ministers Retreat in Phuket, 20–21 February 2002.

Ministerial meetings

Summits

Member states

The ACD was founded by 18 members. Since May 2019, the organization consists of 35 states as listed below (including all current members of the ASEAN and the GCC). Overlapping regional organization membership in italics.

See also
Asia Council
Asia–Europe Meeting
Asian Clearing Union
Asian Currency Unit
Asian Development Bank
Asian Infrastructure Investment Bank
Asian Parliamentary Assembly
Belt and Road Initiative
Conference on Interaction and Confidence-Building Measures in Asia
Continental regional organizations
Continental union
East Asia Community
Eurasian Economic Union
International organization
Pan-Asianism
Shanghai Cooperation Organisation

References

Further reading
Why We Need an Asian Union
European Policy Centre (2005-01): EU and Asian Integration Processes Compared
The Guardian (2005-04-12): Hopes and Fears of an Asian Union
International Herald Tribune (2005-06-18): Toward an 'Asian Union'?
Asia Times (2005-10-01): Hedging China with FTAs
International Herald Tribune (2005-12-16): An Asian Union? Not Yet
Bangkok Post (2006-05-19): Towards a Truly Pan-Asian Community
China Daily (2007-04-21): Asian Integration Still a Long Way Off
Tehran Times (2010-03-14): Ahmadinejad Proposes Establishment of Asian Union

External links
Asia Cooperation Dialogue
Asia Regional Integration Center
Association for Asian Union
Boao Forum for Asia
New Asia Forum
Society for Asian Integration

Continental unions
International organizations based in Asia
Organizations associated with ASEAN
Organizations established in 2002